Barbet is a name used more than once by the U.S. Navy:

 , a coastal minesweeper commissioned on 29 September 1941.
 , a minesweeper commissioned on 8 June 1942.

References 
 

United States Navy ship names